Fatehpur is a constituency of the Uttar Pradesh Legislative Assembly covering the city of Fatehpur in the Fatehpur district of Uttar Pradesh, India. It is one of six assembly constituencies in the Fatehpur Lok Sabha constituency. Since 2008, this assembly constituency is numbered 240 amongst 403 constituencies.

The seat belongs to Samajwadi Party candidate Chandra Prakash Lodhi  who won in the 2022 Uttar Pradesh Legislative Assembly election defeating BJP candidate Vikram Singh by a margin of 8601 votes.

Elected MLA 

 by poll

Wards/Areas
It contains these parts of Fatehpur district-
Rampur Thariyaon, Haswa, Nagar, Bahua (NP) & Fatehpur MB of Fatehpur Tehsil.

Election results

2022

References

External links
 

Assembly constituencies of Uttar Pradesh
Fatehpur, Uttar Pradesh